"Under Siege (Regnum Irae)" is Sepultura's third single, as well as the third of three to be released from the album Arise. No music video was produced for the song.

At this stage in their career the band had recorded little material to be used as B-sides, which is why the Arise singles are so similar. This single and the previous one ("Dead Embryonic Cells") have exactly the same artwork (a detail of the Arise album cover artwork by Michael Whelan) and B-sides.

Track listing

"Under Siege (Regnum Irae)" (album version)
"Orgasmatron" (Motörhead cover)
"Troops of Doom" (This is the re-recorded version of the song which originally appeared on the album Morbid Visions.)

Personnel
Max Cavalera – lead vocals, rhythm guitar
Igor Cavalera – drums
Andreas Kisser – lead guitar, bass (uncredited)
Paulo Jr. – bass (credited, but did not perform)
Produced by Scott Burns and Sepultura
Recorded and engineered by Scott Burns
Mixed by Andy Wallace
Assistant engineers: Fletcher McClean and Steve Sisco

Sepultura songs
1991 singles
1991 songs
Roadrunner Records singles
Songs about death
Songs critical of religion
Songs written by Igor Cavalera
Songs written by Max Cavalera
Songs written by Andreas Kisser
Songs written by Paulo Jr.